Streptomyces cinereus is a bacterium species from the genus of Streptomyces which has been isolated from soil. Streptomyces cinereus produces ferramidochloromycin.

See also 
 List of Streptomyces species

References

Further reading

External links
Type strain of Streptomyces cinereus at BacDive -  the Bacterial Diversity Metadatabase

cinereus
Bacteria described in 1986